Sermilik Glacier is a glacier located in the southern Byam Martin Mountains of Bylot Island, Nunavut, Canada. It lies in Sirmilik National Park.

See also

List of glaciers in Canada

References

Glaciers of Qikiqtaaluk Region
Arctic Cordillera